Cispius may refer to:

 various members of the Roman gens Cispia; see also Cispius.
 the  Mons Cispius, or Cispian Hill, one of several summits of the Esquiline Hill in Rome.
Cispius (spider), a genus of spider.